At the 1966 GANEFO, the athletics events were held in Phnom Penh, Cambodia in November and December. A total of 21 men's and 12 women's athletics events were contested at the competition. The program was the same as the previous edition, except that the men's decathlon and steeplechase events were dropped. Composed entirely of athletes from Asian nations, the events served as a counterpart to the athletics at the 1966 Asian Games, which featured largely Western-allied Asian nations.

Continuing on from the first GANEFO, China dominated the athletics competition, winning nineteen of the gold medals on offer. North Korea was the next most successful with ten gold medals. North Vietnam, Syria and Cambodia each won one gold medal each.

Ni Zhiqin, China's leading men's high jumper, was the only man to defend his title from the 1963 games. Zheng Fengrong, a former world record holder, added the high jump gold to the defence of her women's pentathlon title and also an 80 metres hurdles bronze. The most successful athlete of the tournament was Sin Kim-dan, who won the 200 metres, 400 metres and 800 metres titles – this meant she managed to defend all her 1963 titles.

Medal summary

Men

Women

References

Medalists
GANEFO Games. GBR Athletics. Retrieved on 2015-01-14.

GANEFO
1966 GANEFO
GANEFO athletics
1966 GANEFO